This is a list of countries by freshwater withdrawal mostly based on The World Factbook, accessed in June 2008.

References

Lists of countries by consumption
Geography-related lists
Lists of countries by economic indicator
 Freshwater
Environmental issues with water
Lists of countries by population-related issue
Environment-related lists by country